Allen Tucker (1838 – February 22, 1903) was an American soldier who fought in the American Civil War. Tucker received his country's highest award for bravery during combat, the Medal of Honor. Tucker's medal was won for his extraordinary heroism during the assault on Fort Gregg during the Third Battle of Petersburg in Virginia, on April 2, 1865. He was honored with the award on May 10, 1894.

Tucker was born in Lyme, Connecticut, and entered service in Franklin, Connecticut. He was buried in at Evergreen Cemetery in New Haven, Connecticut.

Medal of Honor citation

See also
List of American Civil War Medal of Honor recipients: T–Z

References

1838 births
1903 deaths
American Civil War recipients of the Medal of Honor
Burials in Connecticut
People of Connecticut in the American Civil War
People from Lyme, Connecticut
Union Army officers
United States Army Medal of Honor recipients
Military personnel from Connecticut
People from Sprague, Connecticut
Date of birth unknown